All of the Good Ones Are Taken is the sixth solo studio album of Ian Hunter. The album contains a mix of several styles. Longtime collaborator Mick Ronson was mostly absent (he only played guitar on one track), because he was seriously considering quitting the music business.

In 2007, the album was reissued with a single bonus track.  In a recent biography Ian Hunter explained that the song "Death 'n' Glory Boys" was inspired by the then-current Falklands war.  Also, "Somethin's Goin' On" reflects Hunter's reaction to the Nuclear arms race. "Speechless" was later covered by Status Quo. "Every Step of the Way" was also later covered by The Monkees on their reunion album Pool It! (1987).

Track listing
All songs written by Ian Hunter except where noted
 "All of the Good Ones Are Taken" (fast version) – 3:42
 "Every Step of the Way" (Hunter, Mark Clarke) – 3:55
 "Fun" (Hunter, Mark Clarke, Hilly Michaels) – 4:21
 "Speechless" – 3:49
 "Death 'n' Glory Boys" – 5:57
 "That Girl is Rock 'n' Roll" – 3:18
 "Somethin's Goin' On" – 4:33
 "Captain Void 'n' the Video Jets" – 4:12
 "Seeing Double" – 4:24
 "All of the Good Ones Are Taken" (slow version) – 3:48
 "Traitor" (single version) – 3:57
 bonus track on reissued CD

Personnel
 Ian Hunter - lead vocals, guitar, piano
 Mick Ronson - lead guitar on "Death 'n' Glory Boys"
 Robbie Alter - guitar, vocals
 Tommy Mandel - keyboards
 Bob Mayo - keyboards
 Hilly Michaels - drums
 Mark Clarke - bass guitar, vocals
 Clarence Clemons - tenor saxophone on "All of Good Ones Are Taken" (slow & fast versions) and "Seeing Double"
 Louis Cortelezzi - alto saxophone
 Dan Hartman - bass guitar on "Speechless"
 Jeff Bova - keyboards on "Speechless"
 Jimmy Ripp - guitars on "All of the Good Ones Are Taken" and "That Girl is Rock 'n' Roll"
 Rory Dodd - backing vocals on "All of the Good Ones Are Taken"
 Eric Troyer - backing vocals on "All of the Good Ones Are Taken"
Technical
 Mike Scott - engineer
 Jon Mathias - remix
 John Berg, Pietro Alfieri - art direction, design
 Edie Baskin, Sharon Haskel - artwork

References

1983 albums
Ian Hunter (singer) albums
Columbia Records albums
Albums produced by Max Norman